National Computer Camps are computer camps for children and teens founded in 1977 by Dr. Michael Zabinski. There are locations at Fairfield University in Fairfield, Connecticut, where Dr. Zabinski is a professor of physics and engineering;  Oglethorpe University in Atlanta, Georgia;  and Baldwin Wallace University in Cleveland, Ohio.

The focus of NCC is 2D and 3D video game design, computer programming, digital video production, web page design, A+ and Network+ certification, Android App programming, and software applications including animation, Flash and Photoshop. An optional sports program is also available. Each week, all levels of programming are offered in Basic, C++, Java, assembler, HTML, XML, and JavaScript. Campers may attend one or multi-week sessions.

NCC was the first summer camp for children founded with a primary focus on computing.

References

External links
National Computer Camps Official Website

1977 establishments in Connecticut
Computing and society
Summer camps in the United States